Aluf Aharon Remez (8 May 1919 – 3 April 1994) was an Israeli civil servant, politician and diplomat, and the second commander of the Israeli Air Force.

Biography
Born in Tel Aviv in 1919, Remez's father David was Israel's first Minister of Transportation. He joined the Haganah in 1936. Three years later he was sponsored by the Jewish Agency to receive flying lessons in New Jersey. Whilst in the United States he also served as an emissary of the Habonim movement between 1939 and 1942.

In December 1942 he joined the Royal Air Force, and trained to fly in Canada. Completed his OTU in the United Kingdom, he was posted to No. 41 Squadron RAF in April 1945 and served as a combat pilot with the unit until March 1946.

Following the end of World War II he helped organise illegal immigration from Europe. He was released by the RAF in 1947 and rejoined the Haganah, in which he was appointed operations officer and chief of staff of its air wing, Sherut Avir. In July 1948 he became the second commander of the newly created Israeli Air Force, serving until December 1950.

Between 1951 and 1953 he headed the Ministry of Defense's purchasing delegation to the United States. From 1953 until 1954 he served as aviation advisor to Defense Minister David Ben-Gurion, and from 1954 until 1959 was a member of the Solel Boneh board.

He was elected to the Knesset on the Mapai list in 1955, but resigned his seat on 19 December 1957, and was replaced by Amos Degani. Between 1959 and 1960 he worked as the administrative director of the Weizmann Institute, and later served as director of the Department for International Co-operation in Ministry of Foreign Affairs.

In 1965 he was appointed ambassador the United Kingdom, a post he held until 1970. From 1970 until 1977 he headed the Port Authority, and from 1977 until 1981 chaired the Israel Airports Authority.

References

External links

Aharon Remez, 75; Led Israeli Air Force New York Times, 6 April 1994

1919 births
1994 deaths
People from Tel Aviv
Haganah members
Royal Air Force personnel of World War II
Israeli aviators
Israeli Air Force generals
Israeli civil servants
20th-century Israeli Jews
Members of the 3rd Knesset (1955–1959)
Ambassadors of Israel to the United Kingdom
Mapai politicians